Rosalie (Rosa) Nachmanson née Davidson (20 March 1852 - 9 November 1916) was a Swedish philanthropist and charity worker. She was the daughter of conditor Wilhelm Davidson who in the mid 1800s opened the known restaurant Hasselbacken in Stockholm. After her death she left a fortune of 3.5 million (SEK). Half of the money was to be handed over to people close to her and the rest was to be given to several charity health care causes.

References

1852 births
1916 deaths
Swedish philanthropists
19th-century philanthropists